The Hay Bridge is a road bridge that carries the Cobb Highway across the Murrumbidgee River at Hay, New South Wales, Australia. The current bridge is the second bridge located in Hay that crosses the Murrumbidgee; the first bridge was in operation from 1873 until 1973; the second and current bridge has operated since 1973.

Current bridge 
The current Hay Bridge is a six-span, reinforced concrete and steel box girder structure supported on steel piles and slender concrete piers. A  footway has been provided for pedestrian use.

The base and walls of each cell are steel plates and the reinforced concrete deck forms the top section. A feature of the design is the cantilever construction of the girders. This allows a greater distance between piers than a simply supported span design.

Due to the complete absence of rock in this deposit,  in rolled "H" section steel piles have been used for the foundations.

Coffer dams of steel sheet piling were constructed in the river to enable the construction of the two pile caps and the lower portions of the two piers in the river.

The bridge was designed by Gordon Bull and Associates, Consulting Engineers and was constructed by contract to and under the supervision of the Department by Central Constructions of New South Wales. The approaches were designed and constructed by the Department. The total cost of the bridge and approaches was 890,000. The completion of this bridge by the DMR, together with the channelisation of the intersection of State Highways Nos 14 and 21 immediately south of the bridge and the reconstruction of Lachlan Street, State Highway No. 21, Cobb Highway by Hay Shire Council, immediately north of the bridge, ensured a smoother flow of traffic through the town of Hay.

Former bridge 

The former Hay Bridge was a swing bridge that carried the Cobb Highway across the Murrumbidgee River from 1873 until 1973.

The bridge consisted of two fixed and two swing spans. It was of a lattice girder design, with timber decking. The drum was a composite of cast and wrought iron that was carried on the centre pier. The opening of the bridge was operated by hand. The bridge was opened to allow riverboats to pass the bridge.

The swinging spans turned on a pier in the centre of the river. The upper part of the central pier was fitted with adjusting screws to regulate weights, and carried the gearing and platform used to turn the bridge.

The piers for the side spans each consisted of a pair of  cylinders, each  in diameter of cast and wrought iron. All the piers were filled with brickwork and concrete and braced together with iron rivets. The piers of the side span had  adjusting screws for equalising the heights of swing and fixed spans.

The contractors for the ironwork were P. N. Russell and Co., and the sinking and fixing of the piers was by the Government of New South Wales under Mr K. A. Franklin. P. N. Russell and Co. won the tender for the iron bridgework in January 1870 and the cylinders for the piers were cast at their works in Sydney during 1870. There was a separate contract for the approaches, which was the last piece of work to be finished. Construction began around September 1871 and all work was completed in 1873.

The bridge was officially opened by the Premier of New South Wales, Sir Henry Parkes, on 29 August 1874, when he named the new bridge the Hay Bridge. A toll was payable for using the bridge up to 1890. The bridge had a permanent caretaker whose job was to keep up the opening mechanism and open the bridge when needed to allow river traffic to pass.

Even before the bridge opened, two riverboats had minor collisions with it. In 1906, the river steamer William Davies was involved in an accident while passing the bridge. There were also a number of serious traffic accidents on the bridge and its approaches. Some of these were put down to the poor condition of the bridge roadway, which was very narrow for motor traffic.

In 1931, the opening mechanism of the old bridge had broken and the steamboat PS Pevensey had to pull the span open and then pull it closed again. By the 1930s river traffic on the Murrumbidgee was in decline. The last occasions when the bridge was opened were, in August 1936, for Ulonga and, in early 1937 for Adeline, carrying a load of timber. The swing span was locked in 1937.

The Hay Bridge was demolished in 1973 and replaced with a modern concrete bridge. The turntable of the old bridge was relocated to the Lions Park in Hay.

References

Murrumbidgee River
Hay, New South Wales
Bridges in the Riverina
1873 establishments in Australia
1973 disestablishments in Australia
1973 establishments in Australia
Bridges completed in 1973
Concrete bridges in Australia
Box girder bridges
Crossings of the Murrumbidgee River